Mildred Waltrip (1911–2004) was an American artist and illustrator.

Waltrip suffered from polio during her lifetime, and wore leg braces. She received her art education at the School of the Art Institute of Chicago.

Waltrip took part in the Works Progress Administration's art program, completing the murals World Map and People and American Characters in 1938 at the Hatch Elementary School in Oak Park, Chicago. In 1995 the murals were removed, as they portrayed Africans stereotypically, "carrying spears, wearing loincloths and sporting prominent red lips". The removed murals were placed in storage.

By the mid 1950s she was illustrating children's books, including Molecules Today and Tomorrow and Research Adventures for Young Scientists.

Books illustrated
Your World in Motion: The Story of Energy, 1956
The First Book of Submarines, 1957
The Adventure Book of Stars, 1958 
The Science Book of Jets And Rockets, 1961
Science Projects for Young People, 1964

Museum collections
Her work is included in the collections of the Smithsonian American Art Museum, the Detroit Institute of Arts, the Baltimore Museum of Art, 
the Art Institute of Chicago, 
the National Gallery of Art, Washington and the Museum of Modern Art, New York.

References

1911 births
2004 deaths
School of the Art Institute of Chicago alumni
Works Progress Administration in Illinois
20th-century American women artists
21st-century American women artists